Neville Charlton, nicknamed "Boxhead" (1928–2014), was an Australian professional rugby league footballer who played in the 1940s, 1950s and 1960s.  He played for Canterbury-Bankstown, Western Suburbs and Eastern Suburbs as a prop.

Playing career
Charlton began his career with Canterbury in 1948 and spent 6 seasons with the club playing a total of 61 games.  In 1954, Charlton moved to Western Suburbs and played 143 games for the club.  Charlton was a member of the 1958 and 1961 sides which made the grand final but were on the losing side against St George on both occasions the latter playing as captain.  In 1962, Charlton joined Eastern Suburbs and spent two seasons there before retiring.  Charlton also played for New Souths Wales on 3 occasions between 1959 and 1961.

Post playing
In retirement, Charlton was a committee member of the league of men foundation.  He was later voted in the Western Suburbs team of the century and was inducted into the clubs hall of fame.  He died on 13 June 2014.

References

1928 births
2014 deaths
Western Suburbs Magpies players
Sydney Roosters players
Canterbury-Bankstown Bulldogs players
New South Wales rugby league team players
Australian rugby league players
Rugby league players from Sydney
Rugby league props